Yursiah-e Kola Mahalleh (also Romanized as Yūrsīāh-e Kolā Maḩalleh) is a village in Gatab-e Shomali Rural District, Gatab District, Babol County, Mazandaran Province, Iran. At the 2006 census, its population was 264, in 72 families.

References 

Populated places in Babol County